Guillaume Chaine (born 24 October 1986) is a French judoka.

He participated at the 2018 World Judo Championships, winning a medal.

On 12 November 2022 he won a gold medal at the 2022 European Mixed Team Judo Championships as part of team France.

References

External links

 

1986 births
Living people
French male judoka
Sportspeople from Colombes
European Games medalists in judo
European Games bronze medalists for France
Judoka at the 2019 European Games
Judoka at the 2020 Summer Olympics
Medalists at the 2020 Summer Olympics
Olympic medalists in judo
Olympic gold medalists for France
Olympic judoka of France
21st-century French people